Lars Schybergson (7 December 1884 – 12 December 1976) was a Finnish footballer. He played in one match for the Finland national football team in 1914.

References

External links
 

1884 births
1976 deaths
Finnish footballers
Finland international footballers
Footballers from Helsinki
Association football forwards
FC Kiffen 08 players